Robert Anthony (born May 15, 1948) is a Republican politician from the U.S. state of Oklahoma. Anthony is serving his fifth consecutive six-year term on the Oklahoma Corporation Commission, where he has served since 1989. He was an unsuccessful candidate for the United States Senate in 2004, and unsuccessful candidate for United States Congress running against Glenn English in 1990. Anthony is term-limited in 2024.

Early life and career
Anthony was born at St. Anthony Hospital in Oklahoma City on May 15, 1948.
Anthony earned a bachelor's degree from the Wharton School of Finance at the University of Pennsylvania, a master's degree in economics from the London School of Economics, a master's degree from Yale University and a master's degree in public administration from the Kennedy School of Government at Harvard University.

Anthony was a captain in the United States Army Reserves, worked in his grandfather's retail clothing company C.R. Anthony Co. Worked as a staff economist for the Interior Committee of the United States House of Representatives and as a consultant for the Library of Congress from 1976 to 1979. He was the president of C.R. Anthony Co. (A chain of Oklahoma-based retail stores founded by his grandfather C.R. Anthony in 1922 in Cushing, Oklahoma.) from 1980 to 1987.

Political career
Anthony served as a member of the Oklahoma City Council from 1979–1980. He first won election to the Oklahoma Corporation Commission (OCC) in 1988 and took office in 1989. He was re-elected in 1994, 2000, 2006, 2012, and again in 2018. In 2004 he entered the race to succeed Don Nickles in the United States Senate, but finished third in the primary, losing to Tom Coburn.

Anthony revealed in late 1992 that he had been cooperating in a federal bribery probe, secretly taping utility company representatives who broke laws prohibiting donations to regulators. The scandal was averted at the last minute by a company buyout.

In August 2018, Anthony won the Republican nomination for a seat on the OCC. He went on to face Democrat Ashley Nicole McCray and Independent Jackie Short in the November election. Anthony won re-election with 60% of the vote.

Electoral history

References

External links
 
 *Voices of Oklahoma interview with Bob Anthony. First person interview conducted on April 27, 2010, with Bob Anthony.

1948 births
21st-century American politicians
Alumni of the London School of Economics
American United Methodists
Corporation Commissioners of Oklahoma
Harvard Kennedy School alumni
Living people
Oklahoma city council members
Oklahoma Republicans
Wharton School of the University of Pennsylvania alumni
Yale University alumni